Events from the year 2008 in Scotland

Incumbents 

First Minister and Keeper of the Great Seal – Alex Salmond
 Secretary of State for Scotland – Des Browne until 3 October; then Jim Murphy

Law officers 
 Lord Advocate – Elish Angiolini
 Solicitor General for Scotland – Frank Mulholland
 Advocate General for Scotland – Lord Davidson of Glen Clova

Judiciary 
 Lord President of the Court of Session and Lord Justice General – Lord Hamilton
 Lord Justice Clerk – Lord Gill
 Chairman of the Scottish Land Court – Lord McGhie

Events

January 
 January – first phase of Whitelee Wind Farm, which will be the largest wind farm in Europe, begins feeding electricity to the grid.

February 
 1 February – Eigg Electrical begins generation of the island's entire electricity supply from renewable energy sources.

April 
 6 April – the Corporate Manslaughter and Corporate Homicide Act 2007 comes into force.

May 
 19 May – First ScotRail reopens the railway line from Stirling to Alloa for passengers.

June 
 4 June – Gretna F.C., just relegated from the Scottish Premier League, go out of business with debts of £4,000,000.

July 
 7 July – The Antonine Wall, part of the ancient Roman limes, is designated as a World Heritage Site.
 25 July – Old Monach lighthouse on Shillay, Monach Islands, re-lit.

November 
 6 November – Lindsay Roy retains the seat for the Labour Party at the Glenrothes by-election with a majority of 6,737 votes. The previous Labour MP John MacDougall died on 13 August 2008 from pleural mesothelioma.
 14 November – Sixteen-year-old Nicolle Earley kills 63-year-old Ann Gray at her home in Crosshill, Fife.
 19 November – Clackmannanshire Bridge over the Firth of Forth at Kincardine is opened to traffic.
 20 November – Health Secretary Nicola Sturgeon is named Scottish Politician of the Year.

December 
 18 December – Woolworths announce their 807 UK stores will close by 5 January 2009.
 27 December – first seventeen of Woolworths branches in Scotland close, with the rest to follow shortly.

Deaths 
 27 July – Bob Crampsey, historian, author and broadcaster (born 1930)
 8 October – John Bannerman, historian of Gaelic Scotland (born 1932)
 5 November – Ian Anderson, footballer (born 1954)
 18 December – Hannah Frank, visual artist (born 1908)

The arts
 Alternative hip hop group Young Fathers forms in Edinburgh.
 Peter Maxwell Davies composes his String Trio.
 Supermarionation band is formed in Edinburgh.

See also 
 Timeline of Scottish history
 2008 in England
 2008 in Northern Ireland
 2008 in the United Kingdom
 2008 in Wales

References 

 
Scotland
Years of the 21st century in Scotland
2000s in Scotland